Schumann Nunatak is a nunatak 2 nautical miles (3.7 km) south of Salvador Nunatak, at the southwest end of Freyberg Mountains. Mapped by United States Geological Survey (USGS) from surveys and U.S. Navy air photos, 1960–64. Named by Advisory Committee on Antarctic Names (US-ACAN) for Edward A. Schumann, cosmic ray researcher at McMurdo Station in 1967.

Nunataks of Victoria Land
Pennell Coast